Phonic FM is a community radio station in Exeter, Devon, England. The station was set up in 2008 and started broadcasting on 15 February 2008. Phonic FM was originally called Vibraphonic FM and broadcast as part of a one-month Music Festival in the City of Exeter called The Vibraphonic Music Festival.

Initially the station was broadcasting using a Restricted Service Licence. This meant the station could only broadcast for one month a year during the festival, but in 2008 Phonic FM gained a five-year full-time broadcasting licence.

Shows include The Edge of Jazz,  The Future Sound of Exeter Show, Anti Telly Time, Planet Fear, Revolutionary Radio Request Show, The Sunday Scribble, Ja-Fu-Re, A Head of the Curve and a host of other shows to be found at the website www.phonic.fm. The station pursues a No Playlists and No Adverts policy, and plays a wide range of other music including, funk, soul, hip hop, blues, rock and alternative. It also has a classical music programme and an arts review programme. From early 2009, it has had the capacity to record live, in addition to "as live" sessions from local musicians and bands in the adjacent Sound Gallery Studios.

In the June 2008 Radio World International Edition (Volume 36 #2) the station was described thus, "There is nothing quite like it on the U.K. dial. It is the perfect antidote for complaints about high rotation playlists, or that all stations these days sound much the same. This one certainly does not. Phonic.fm is a genuinely refreshing, genuine alternative, from which the best is yet to come."

In 2009, the station was reviewed by the Times Online website. Writer Christian Brook said:

Trying to find a decent alternative music radio station in the UK has always proved tricky ... Now, however, a community radio station called Phonic in Exeter, Devon, is ticking all the right boxes and is providing some of the most inspiring broadcasting in the country.

Billed as Exeter’s "sound alternative" Phonic is mainly self-funded but has had grants from local councils, manned by volunteer staff, and has a remit to promote the culture of the city ... you always know some unexpected musical delight is not far away ... there is nothing quite like it in the UK.

It's almost an alternative alternative station; it's not run of the mill singles and famous tracks that you'll hear (though there are a smattering of them) it's the obscure, seldom played album and session tracks that get an airing.

In November 2012, the regulator, OFCOM, offered a five-year extension to the licence which was re-newed in 2018. In April 2015, as a result of changes in the law, Phonic.FM, together with 18 other stations previously denied access to either advertising or sponsorship, had their promises of performance altered to allow them to accept either, up to a centrally controlled limit. The Directors of Phonic.FM took the decision not to accept paid-for advertising, and consider their position on the question of sponsorship.

In 2020 the station joined with 5 other partners to apply for the Exeter SSDAB+ (Small scale DAB) licence In 2021 it announced that the bid had been successful and intended to broadcast to an extended area in the Greater Exeter region. It expects to start broadcasting on DAB+ during 2022, whilst continuing with its output on its FM frequency.

References

External links
 Phonic FM official website

Community radio stations in the United Kingdom
Radio stations established in 2008
Mass media in Exeter
Radio stations in Devon